This is a list of attractions in Busch Gardens Tampa Bay.

Roller coasters
Roller coasters currently operating or under construction at Busch Gardens Tampa.

Water rides
Water rides that are currently operating at Busch Gardens Tampa.

Other rides and attractions
Rides and attractions that are currently operating at Busch Gardens Tampa.

Shows
Current shows that are at Busch Gardens Tampa as of June 2021.

Previous attractions and shows
These attractions or shows are either closed or demolished.

References

Tourist attractions in Tampa, Florida
Busch